James Patrick McCarthy (November 28, 1920 – December 2, 1991) was an American football end.

McCarthy was born in Lockport, Illinois, in 1920 and attended Lockport High School. He played college football at Illinois.

He played professional football in the All-America Football Conference for the Brooklyn Dodgers from 1946 to 1947, the Chicago Rockets in 1948, and the Chicago Hornets in 1949. He appeared in 54 games, 35 as a starter, and caught 28 passes for 531 yards and three touchdowns. 

He died in 1991 in Orland Park, Illinois.

References

1920 births
1991 deaths
American football ends
Brooklyn Dodgers (AAFC) players
Chicago Rockets players
Chicago Hornets players
Illinois Fighting Illini football players
Lewis Flyers football coaches
People from Lockport, Illinois
Players of American football from Illinois